Pubescence is a 2011 Chinese teen sex comedy film directed and written by Guan Xiaojie, starring Zhao Yihuan and Wang Yi. It is the first film in the Pubescence theatrical series. The film was a box-office hit and spawned three direct sequels: Paradise Lost, Pubescence 3, and Pubescence 4. It was released on 20 July 2011. The film is regarded as China's American Pie.

Cast
 Zhao Yihuan as Cheng Xiaoyu, a teenage girl with severe conduct problems.
 Wang Yi as Wang Xiaofei, a homeboy who loves Cheng Xiaoyu.
 Wang Mengting as Chanel.
 Guo Jiawei as Lizi.
 Gu Zheng as Qingchun.
 Qin Hanlei as Qin Xianglin, the PE teacher.

References

External links
 

2010s teen comedy films
Chinese sex comedy films
Films directed by Guan Xiaojie
Films about puberty
2011 comedy films
2011 films